Nude Against the Light or Backlit Nude is an oil-on-canvas painting by the French Post-Impressionist painter Pierre Bonnard. Created in 1908, it is now in the collection of the Royal Museums of Fine Arts of Belgium in Brussels.

The work depicts the artist's partner and frequent model Marthe de Mėrigny applying eau de Cologne after a bath in a tub. She is nude and standing silhouetted against the light from the windows which fills the room with bright warm shadowless light and colour. The bather is reflected in a mirror, a characteristic feature of Bonnard's paintings.

See also
100 Great Paintings

References

1908 paintings
Paintings by Pierre Bonnard
Collections of the Royal Museums of Fine Arts of Belgium